Community Accountability is
a community-based strategy, rather than a police/prison-based strategy, to address violence including domestic violence, sexual violence, and child abuse.
Community Accountability is a process in which a community – a group of friends, a family, a church, a workplace, an apartment complex, a neighborhood, etc. – work together to do the following things:

 Create and affirm values and practices that resist abuse and oppression and encourage safety, support, and accountability
 Develop strategies to address abusive behavior of community members and help them to transform their behavior
 Work on the evolution of the community and all its members, to transform the political conditions that reinforce oppression and violence
 Provide safety and support to community members who are violently targeted with respect to their self-determination

See also
Transformative justice

References

External links
 Social Justice Journal Issue about "Community Accountability: Emerging Movements to Transform Violence"

Community development